Kim Han-bin (born October 22, 1996), known professionally as B.I is a South Korean rapper, singer, songwriter, dancer and record producer. Until his departure in 2019, he was the leader of the South Korean boy band iKon under YG Entertainment, and was credited with the production and songwriting for all releases by the group.
In 2021, he debuted as a solo artist under his self-founded label, 131, with the self-written charity single album Midnight Blue (Love Streaming) and full-length charity studio album Waterfall. Cosmos, the first half of his self-written second studio album dedicated to youth and love, was released in November 2021. In 2022, he launched his global album project Love or Loved, starting with the single "BTBT" in May, followed by the EP Love or Loved Part.1 in November.

Early life 
Kim Han-bin was born on October 22, 1996, in Cheonan, South Korea. 

In 2009, B.I made his first appearance by featuring and participating in promotions for MC Mong's single "Indian Boy", including live performances and accompanying the rapper to the TV show You Hee-yeol's Sketchbook. He also appeared in the music video for the song and had a cameo appearance in the music video of another song by MC Mong, "Horror Show". 

B.I joined YG Entertainment as a trainee in January 2011.

Career

2013–2014: Pre-debut activities
After over two years of training, B.I took part on the Mnet reality survival program WIN: Who Is Next as a contestant under Team B. Because Team A won the program, B.I continued as a trainee under YG Entertainment. On May 14, 2014, it was revealed B.I and label-mate Bobby would compete in Mnet's Show Me the Money 3. During the show's run, B.I released the digital single "Be I", which he wrote and co-produced with Choice37 and became the first single from the show to top charts. He was only 17 years old and a trainee at the time.

In September 2014, it was announced Team B would return to compete on survival program Mix & Match, where filming began in midst of B.I's appearance on Show Me the Money. The show resulted in the debut of Team B, alongside trainee Jung Chan-woo, under the group name iKon. In October 2014, B.I featured in label-mate Epik High's lead single "Born Hater" alongside Beenzino, Verbal Jint, Bobby, and Winner's Mino; they performed track together at the 2014 Mnet Asian Music Awards.

2015–2019: Career with iKon and solo endeavors

On September 15, 2015, B.I debuted as the leader of iKon under YG Entertainment with their warm-up single "My Type", followed by lead singles "Rhythm Ta" and "Airplane". 

In addition to being the leader of iKon, B.I also participated in a few solo endeavors during that time. In December 2015, B.I and fellow iKon member Kim Jinhwan joined the cast of JTBC's Mari and I. Then in June 2017, B.I along with member Bobby, featured in label-mate Psy's studio album 4X2=8 on the track "Bomb". B.I also featured in Seungri's debut studio album, The Great Seungri, released on July 20, 2018, on the track "Mollado".

In December 2018, B.I received the Songwriter of the Year award at the 10th Melon Music Awards for iKon's single "Love Scenario" from their studio album Return. 

In 2019, B.I was cast for JTBC2's variety show Grand Buda-guest. He also featured on label-mate Lee Hi's single "No One", and co-wrote and co-produced the track "1, 2" from her extended play (EP) 24°C.

2020–present: Continued solo activities

Despite leaving iKon and YG Entertainment in June 2019, B.I wrote and composed four of the five songs in his former group's 2020 EP I Decide,  including the title track "Dive", released by YG Entertainment on February 6, 2020.

On September 28, 2020, B.I was appointed as the executive director of IOK Company. On January 11, 2021, it was revealed that B.I would feature on Epik High's upcoming tenth studio album Epik High Is Here 上 (Part 1) on the song "Acceptance Speech", which was released on January 18, 2021, along with the rest of the album.

On March 19, 2021, B.I released the charity single album, Midnight Blue (Love Streaming), through IOK Music affiliate 131 Label, whose name is derived from the shape of the letters "B" and "I" together. His debut single album contained three self-written and self-composed songs. An animated music video for lead single "Midnight Blue" was also released on the same day. All tracks had been previously released, partially, as demos via B.I's SoundCloud between 2020 and 2021.

On May 7, 2021, 131 Label announced the release schedule for B.I as a solo artist. This included a global single "Got It Like That" featuring Destiny Rogers and Tyla Yaweh, released on May 14, 2021, and his first full-length studio album, Waterfall, released on June 1, 2021. A cinematic music video for the title track "Illa Illa" was also released alongside the album. The music video surpassed 12.7 million views on YouTube within the first 24 hours of its release, breaking the record for the most viewed K-pop male solo artist debut music video within the first 24 hours.

On August 25, 2021, it was revealed that B.I would feature on his former label-mate Lee Hi's upcoming third studio album 4 Only on the song "Savior", which he wrote and composed. The music video for "Savior" was released on September 3, 2021. Supposedly distributed on August 27, the song was officially released on all platforms on September 9, 2021, along with the rest of the album.

On October 1, 2021, B.I released the digital single "Lost At Sea (Illa Illa 2)", a reinterpretation of "Illa Illa", featuring Bipolar Sunshine and Afgan.

On November 11, 2021, B.I released the first half of his second studio album, Cosmos, including the lead single of the same name. On November 25, he made an appearance on TV5's Lunch Out Loud, a Philippine variety show. In January 2022, B.I became the first K-pop and Asian act to participate in the digital performance series made by The Recording Academy to spotlight artists from around the world, called GRAMMY Global Spin. He performed the song "Nineteen", which was part of his album Cosmos.

In May 2022, B.I announced his global album project Love or Loved, with a pre-release collaborative single with Soulja Boy titled "BTBT", featuring DeVita, which was released on May 13. On June 27, he released the single "Lullaby" with Chuu as a collaboration with Dingo Music.

In August 2022, B.I joined the UNIVERSE platform, a South-Korean fandom and artist communication space.

On October 11, 2022, 131 announced that B.I had resigned from his position as an executive director of IOK Company and 131 would go on as an independent label. The label had previously rebranded from 131 Label to 131 (ONE THREE ONE), or 131 for short, on January 30, 2022 and welcomed its first artist other than B.I on September 30, 2022.

The first part of B.I's global project, the studio album Love or Loved Part.1, was released on November 18, 2022, including the pre-release single "BTBT" and new lead single "Keep Me Up".

Philanthropy 
Since 2016, B.I has been privately donating to the Seungil Hope Foundation, a non-profit organization aiming to spread the awareness of ALS. The foundation revealed in 2018 that his donations had come to 30 million won thus far. In 2019, B.I donated ₩10,000,000 to the Hope Bridge National Disaster Relief Association to support the victims affected by the forest fires in Sokcho, Gangwon Province. On June 10, 2019, B.I, and the cast and crew of Grand Buda-Guest donated two tons of dog food worth ₩30,000,000 to a dog shelter in Gyeonggi-do. In 2020, B.I donated 100,000 face masks—worth a total of ₩200,000,000—which were distributed to fans in South Korea, China, Thailand, Japan, Indonesia, and Vietnam amidst the COVID-19 outbreak.

On August 10, 2020, B.I donated shoes to the childcare facility "Angel's Haven for Children". On December 19, 2020, he surprised fans volunteering in Incheon helping deliver coal briquettes to families in need. B.I and IOK Company provided additional support to the briquette sharing project by donating 10,000 KF94 masks.

On December 18, 2020, B.I, and IOK Company donated ₩200,000,000 worth of items, including 200,000 masks and 10,000 underwear, to World Vision, an international relief and development NGO. On January 5, 2021, B.I and IOK company CEO Jang Jin-woo delivered an additional ₩200,000,000 worth of KF94 masks and underwear to Osan City to help the vulnerable during the COVID-19 pandemic.

On March 19, 2021, B.I released a charity single album called Midnight Blue (Love Streaming). He pledged to donate all of the proceeds of the sound sources, recordings, and copyright fees of the single album to World Vision to support children in crisis across the globe. On May 4, 2021, B.I personally met with chairman Cho Myung-hwan at the World Vision Office in Seoul to donate all the profits from the sale of 10,000 limited edition single albums of Midnight Blue (Love Streaming). In addition, B.I promised to continuously donate all the revenue from the digital music sales and copyright fees that the single album would accrue.

On September 17, 2021, IOK Company announced that B.I had made a second donation to World Vision. B.I decided to conduct a "monthly donation project" to continuously provide his music and copyright profits from his Midnight Blue (Love Streaming) and Waterfall albums. The donations include all copyright fees, music and album sales, and content revenue generated following the album's release and go towards the Basic for Girls project, which aims to improve help construct women's restrooms in Zambia, Africa and support the provision of sanitary napkins.

Drug allegation controversy and departure from iKon
On June 12, 2019, it was revealed that B.I had allegedly attempted to purchase marijuana and LSD in 2016 from an undisclosed female dealer, and used the former. He was also accused of evading police charges. Following the reports, B.I posted an apology on his personal Instagram account. He acknowledged some of the allegations, explaining that he was going "through a hard and painful time" and wanted something to rely on, and announced his departure from iKon. A few hours later, YG Entertainment confirmed that he had indeed left the group and terminated his exclusive contract. His appearances on television series Law of the Jungle, Grand Buda-Guest, and Stage K were edited out by the networks prior to their broadcast. The dealer was revealed to be Han Seo-hee, who was involved in drug issues with former label-mate T.O.P and received four years of probation in 2017.

In September 2019, it was reported that B.I had admitted during police questioning to violating the Act on the Control of Narcotics in 2016. In February 2020, results of a drug test conducted on B.I were released, revealing no detection of illegal drugs from a sample of B.I's body hair sent by South Korea's Gyeonggi Southern Provincial Police Agency to the National Forensic Service.

On May 28, 2021, B.I was indicted without detention by the violent crimes department of the Seoul Central District Prosecutors’ Office for violating the Act on the Control of Narcotics. During the first hearing, on August 26, 2021, he admitted to all the charges stated by the prosecution: three accounts of illegal marijuana usage and one account of purchasing illegal LSD in 2016. On September 10, 2021, the Seoul Central District Court sentenced B.I to three years of incarceration, suspended for a probationary period of four years, 80 hours of community service, 40 hours of drug education courses, and a fine of ₩1.5 million (approximately US$1,300).

Artistry

Musical style 
B.I has mentioned "Shake Ya Tailfeather" by Nelly, P. Diddy and Murphy Lee, "Song Cry" by Jay-Z or Eminem's "Lose Yourself" as the songs that brought about his dream of becoming a rapper, when he was at primary school.
But while hip-hop and R&B remain major influences on his music,
he also looks up to the "not too elaborate but still very beautiful" music of the Beatles.
Rather than "lock[ing] [him]self into a certain genre," he stated in 2022 that he was intent on exploring as many as he could, always trying to "experiment with new sounds," and "make the boundaries more blurry."
Thus, the song "Savior" he composed for Lee Hi (September 2021) and "Alive" (November 2021) were inspired by jazz,
"Endless Summer" (November 2022) by tropical music and EDM,
"Cosmos" (November 2021) by 1980s rock and doo-wop,
"Illusion" (June 2021) by lo-fi,
and so on. Even though his songs usually highlight electronic sounds,
he has acoustic tracks as well, such as "Remember Me" (March 2021).

Similarly, B.I explained in 2021 that he wouldn't oppose rapping and singing, as they were simply two ways of "expressing the message of [his] music."
He actually sings more than he raps in his album Love or Loved Part.1 (November 2022).

In 2018, B.I discussed the process behind his songwriting, admitting, "Because I don't have much experience, I typically draw a lot of my inspiration from movies or dramas. I'm also the type to draw inspiration from things like poetry". He explained that it was a way of "making up for things I'm unable to experience or feel for myself". When asked what type of music he wanted to make, he stated, "There are just two things. Music that people can relate to and music that draws imagination. Aside from that, the reason that I compose and make music is simply because it’s fun. My hobby doesn’t feel like work just yet".

Songwriting

B.I is credited with writing and composing all the songs in his debut studio album Waterfall, second album Cosmos, and his first single album Midnight Blue (Love Streaming), which he released as a solo artist through 131 Label and IOK Music. 

B.I was the leader of the K-pop group iKon, and was credited with the production and songwriting for all the releases under the group. These include the group's full-length studio albums Welcome Back and Return; compilation album The New Kids; and singles and EPs "#WYD", New Kids: Begin, New Kids: Continue, "Rubber Band", and New Kids: The Final. B.I wrote and composed four of the five songs on the group's 2020 EP, I Decide. For his work on Return, B.I won Songwriter of the Year at the 10th Melon Music Awards. On January 22, 2019, B.I became a full member of the Korea Music Copyright Association (KOMCA). As of February 2023, the KOMCA has 93 songs registered under his name.

Additionally, B.I has written songs for various artists, including MC Mong and numerous current and former artists under YG Entertainment, such as Epik High, Winner, Blackpink, Psy, Seungri, Lee Hi and Eun Ji-won.

Along with South Korean producers Millennium, Sihwang, Padi and Kim Chang-hoon, B.I founded the record production and songwriting team White Noise Club under 131. In 2023, White Noise Club produced A Tempo, the first EP of the South Korean R&B singer-songwriter Soovi, with B.I taking part in writing and composing two of the songs, including the title track "Missing You".

Awards and nominations

Discography

Studio albums

Single albums

Singles

As lead artist

As featured artist

Other charted songs

Guest appearances

Videography

Filmography

Television

Live performances

Concerts
 B.I 2022 All Day Show [L.O.L: The Hidden Stage], Seoul (December 10, 2022)
 B.I 2023 Asia Tour [L.O.L: The Hidden Stage]
 Bangkok (March 4, 2023)
 Manila (March 5, 2023)
 Jakarta (March 10, 2023)
 Taipei (March 12, 2023)
 Singapore (March 18, 2023)
 Macau (April 30, 2023)

Online concerts
 131 Live Presents: B.I First Online Concert (October 3, 2021)
 131 Live Presents: BTBT Performance Online Fancon (June 26, 2022)

Music festivals
 2022 World DJ Festival, Seoul (August 13, 2022)
 KV Fest, Jakarta (August 28, 2022)
 Rapbeat 2022, Gwacheon (September 4, 2022)
 Rolling Loud Press Conference Concert, Bangkok (September 14, 2022)
 LALAPA K-Concert, Bangkok (September 24, 2022)
 Grand Wave Kpop Festival, Kuala Lumpur (January 14, 2023)
 MIK Festival 2023, Paris (February 18, 2023)

Other live performances
 We All Are One [Stop War!] (March 26, 2022) – free online K-pop concert to support the victims of the Russo-Ukrainian War
 B.I 1st Fan Meeting [B.I Offline]
 Seoul (April 30, 2022) – two shows
 Singapore (August 7, 2022)
 Bangkok (August 21, 2022)
 Manila (August 27, 2022) – two shows
 131 X Peaches 'BTBT' Guerrilla Showcase, Seoul (May 28, 2022)
 Identity 2022 (May 28, 2022) – online music festival, part of the celebrations for the AAPI Heritage Month
 Simply K-Pop Con-Tour (June-July, 2022) – episodes 524, 525, 526, 527
 WET! Poolside Party, Seoul (July 23, 2022) – promotional concert for the TV program WET!

Notes

References

External links

 

1996 births
IKon members
Living people
21st-century South Korean singers
Show Me the Money (South Korean TV series) contestants
South Korean hip hop record producers
South Korean hip hop singers
South Korean male dancers
South Korean male idols
South Korean male pop singers
South Korean male rappers
South Korean record producers
South Korean male singer-songwriters
YG Entertainment artists
South Korean singer-songwriters
People from Cheonan